Ahnfeltiales is an order of red algae belonging to the class Florideophyceae. The order consists only one family: Ahnfeltiaceae.

Genera:
 Ahnfeltia E.M.Fries  
 Porphyrodiscus Batters  
 Sterrocolax F.Schmitz

References

Florideophyceae
Red algae orders